The Ministry of Defense of the government of Israel, is the governmental department responsible for defending the State of Israel from internal and external military threats. Its political head is the Defense Minister of Israel, and its offices are located in HaKirya, Tel Aviv.

The Ministry of Defense oversees most of the Israeli security forces, including the Israel Defense Forces (IDF), Israel Military Industries (IMI), and Israel Aerospace Industries (IAI).

The ministry was established when the British Mandate of Palestine ended, and the British Army departed Palestine and the State of Israel was formed. This ended the rag-tag militia units during British rule and gave way to the formal defense of the Jewish state.

Minister of Defense  
The Defense Minister of Israel (Sar HaBitahon, lit. Minister of Security) heads the ministry. The post is considered to be the second most important position in the Israeli cabinet, and usually has a Deputy Minister. The Defense Minister is also a permanent member of the Security Cabinet. Benny Gantz of Blue and White was sworn in on 17 May 2020 as Israel's new Minister of Defense.

Due to the great importance of the defense portfolio, prime ministers have often held the position in addition to their prime ministerial duties; eight of the twenty Defense Ministers to date were also serving Prime Ministers. Six of them (Moshe Dayan, Yitzhak Rabin, Ehud Barak, Shaul Mofaz, Moshe Ya'alon and Benny Gantz) are also former Chiefs of Staff of the Israel Defense Forces.

Amongst the duties of the post, Defense Ministers can request administrative detention. Because of the intensive work and the tension between the political echelon to the military echelon, frequently disagreements and difference of opinion are created between the Defense Minister and the Chief of Staff.

List of ministers

Deputy ministers

Directors General

Structure

Home Front Defense Ministry, headed by the Deputy Defense Minister
Israeli National Emergency Authority, Rahel
Administration for the Development of Weapons and Technological Infrastructure, Maf'at
Coordinator of Government Activities in the Territories, Matpash
Director of Security of the Defense Establishment, Malmab
Defense Establishment Comptroller Unit
Defense Political Branch, Abtam
International Defense Cooperation Directorate, Sibat
Computer and Management information systems, Malam – Data Processing Center
Logistics Operations and properties Branch, Emun
Defense Social branch
Department of Defense Export Control, Api
Tank program Directorate
Procurement and Production Directorate, Manhar
Emergency management, Melakh
Ombudsman for soldiers, Nakhal
Fund and Unit for Discharged Soldiers
Department of Families and Remembrance
Disabled Rehabilitation Division

Notes

External links

Israel Ministry of Defense
All Ministers in the Ministry of Defense Knesset website

 
Defense
Israeli Security Forces
Israel
Defense
Ministry of Defense